Anton Alekseyevich Zinkovsky (born 14 April 1996) is a Russian football player. He plays as a left winger for FC Spartak Moscow.

Club career
He made his professional debut in the Russian Professional Football League for FC Chertanovo Moscow on 17 September 2014 in a game against FC Lokomotiv Liski.

On 13 January 2019, he signed a 3-year contract with Krylia Sovetov Samara. He made his Russian Premier League debut for Krylia Sovetov on 2 March 2019 in a game against FC Lokomotiv Moscow as a 90th-minute substitute for Aleksandr Samedov. On 30 November 2021, he extended his contract with Krylia Sovetov until the end of 2023.

On 23 June 2022, Zinkovsky signed a five-year contract with FC Spartak Moscow. He scored his first goal for the team in a 3-0 victory over PFC Sochi on 15 August 2022.

International career
He was called up to the Russia national football team for the first time for October 2021 World Cup qualifiers against Slovakia and Slovenia.

Honours

Individual
 Russian Premier League Goal of the Month: October 2022 (Spartak 2–2 CSKA Moscow, 16 October 2022)

Career statistics

Club

References

External links
 
 
 

1996 births
People from Novorossiysk
Living people
Russian footballers
Association football midfielders
Russia youth international footballers
Russia under-21 international footballers
FC Kuban Krasnodar players
FC Chertanovo Moscow players
FC Zenit-2 Saint Petersburg players
PFC Krylia Sovetov Samara players
FC Spartak Moscow players
Russian Premier League players
Russian First League players
Russian Second League players
Sportspeople from Krasnodar Krai